Kerry Natasha Millard (born 26 October 1972) is a former Australian Liberal National politician who was the member of the Legislative Assembly of Queensland for Sandgate from 2012 to 2015.

Millard worked in the metals industry for nearly 20 years before entering politics, holding positions such as Account Manager, Brisbane Manager, and Assistant State Manager for a number of merchants who mostly sold Stainless Steel, High Nickel Alloys, and Aluminium. 

After politics Millard studied and completed a Bach. of Science, and is now specialising in genetics.

References

1972 births
Living people
Liberal National Party of Queensland politicians
Members of the Queensland Legislative Assembly
21st-century Australian politicians
21st-century Australian women politicians
Women members of the Queensland Legislative Assembly